Korablik is an island in the Ob River in Pervomaysky District of Novosibirsk, Russia. The Komsomolsky Railway Bridge passes over the island.

Tourism 
The Korablik is used for outdoor recreation. A passenger motor ship goes from the Novosibirsk River Station to the island.

Gallery

References

Islands of Novosibirsk